Canada Vignettes are a series of short films by the National Film Board of Canada (NFB), some of which aired on CBC Television and other Canadian broadcasters as interstitial programs. The vignettes became popular because of their cultural depiction of Canada, and because they represented its changing state, such as the vignette Faces which was made to represent the increasing cultural and ethnic diversity of Canada. The Log Driver's Waltz directed by John Weldon set to the recording of the song by Kate & Anna McGarrigle with, and as part of, The Mountain City Four is one of the most-requested items contained in the collection by the   National Film Board of Canada. A similar series was later produced in the 1990s, however the name was changed to Heritage Minutes.

Conception
The idea for Canada Vignettes began in early 1977, when CBC's children's programming department at the CBC approached the NFB about producing short films, five minutes in length or less, to use as interstitial programming. When Secretary of State for Canada John Roberts announced in the fall of 1977 that $13 million would be given to federal cultural agencies to help promote national unity, the NFB was allocated $2 million to produce films for broadcast on the CBC, similar to CBS's Bicentennial Minutes in the United States, the previous year. The French-language service of the CBC also agreed to broadcast the series.

Production
Eighty filmmakers from across the country worked on the project over a three-year period. Many of the films were animation vignettes offering amusing portrayals of Canadian history, while others were produced from excerpts of NFB documentaries. The NFB decided that no film credits would be included, only a title.

Broadcast
The CBC's children's department subsequently informed the NFB that it could not show films longer than two minutes as their needs had changed in the time that it took to produce the series. A quarter of the vignettes were more than two minutes long. As a solution, the CBC main network agreed to make the longer and shorter films available to their network affiliates. Canada Vignettes were shown on both in prime time and during children's programming slots. The most popular film in the series to air on Canadian television was Canada Vignettes: Faces, an animated short that depicted the faces of Canada, including that of then Prime Minister Pierre Elliot Trudeau. Other Canadian television networks to broadcast the films included CTV, Global, TVOntario, and TVA. The series was also sold to international foreign broadcasters in such countries as Turkey, Italy, Algeria, Norway and the United Kingdom.

List of Vignettes

See also

 O Canada (Cartoon Network series that featured some of the animated Canada Vignettes shorts)
Canada's Story
 Events of National Historic Significance
 Heritage Minutes
 Hinterland Who's Who
 National Historic Sites of Canada
 Persons of National Historic Significance
 The Greatest Canadian

References

External links
Canada - Images of a Country, Vignettes at the National Film Board of Canada
Canada Vignettes listing at National Film Board of Canada
 Canada Vignettes, The Big Cartoon Database
 Episode Guide

National Film Board of Canada series
Short film series
Interstitial television shows
CBC Television original programming
Ici Radio-Canada Télé original programming